Paul Grist may refer to:

 Paul Grist (actor) (born 1939), British actor
 Paul Grist (comics) (born 1960), British comic book creator